Jean Amila (Paris, 24 November 1910 – 6 March 1995) was an anarchist French writer and screenwriter who also wrote under the names John Amila, Jean Mekert, or Jean Meckert.

Works

Science-Fiction
 La ville de plomb
 Le 9 de pique (1956)

Mysteries
 Nous Avons les Mains Rouges (1947)
 Y'a pas de Bon Dieu! (1950)
 Motus! (1953)
 La Bonne Tisane (1955)
 Sans Attendre Godot (1956)
 Le Drakkar (1959)
 Les Loups dans la Bergerie (1959)
 Jusqu'à Plus Soif (1962)
 La Lune d'Omaha (1964)
 Noces de Soufre (1964)
 Pitié pour les Rats (1964)
 Les Fous de Hong-Kong (1969)
 Le Grillon Enragé (1970)
 Contest-Flic (1972)
 La Nef des Dingues (1972)
 Terminus Iéna (1973)
 A Qui ai-je l'Honneur?.. (1974)
 Le Pigeon des Faubourgs (1981)
 Le Chien de Montargis (1983)
 Langes Radieux (1984)
 Au Balcon d'Hiroshima (1985)

Historical Novels
 Le Boucher des Hurlus

Screenplays
 Nous sommes tous des assassins
Le Miroir à deux faces (as Jean Meckert)

References

1910 births
1995 deaths
French male writers
20th-century French male writers
20th-century screenwriters

French anarchists